USS Pruitt (DD-347/DM-22/AG–101) was a Clemson-class destroyer in the United States Navy following World War I. She was named for Corporal John H. Pruitt, USMC,  World War I Medal of Honor recipient.

Pruitt was laid down on 25 June 1919 by Bath Iron Works, Bath, Maine; launched on 2 August 1920; sponsored by Mrs. Belle Pruitt; and commissioned on 2 September 1920.

Service history
During the interwar period, Pruitt operated in the Western Pacific, protecting American interests in the Far East. She was converted to a light minelayer and accordingly redesignated DM-22 on 30 June 1937. LTJG Richard O'Kane, who would be awarded the Medal of Honor as the most successful U.S. submarine officer of World War II, served aboard Pruitt from 1935 through shipyard conversion to a minelayer.

A unit of Mine Division 1, she was undergoing overhaul at the Pearl Harbor Navy Yard on 7 December 1941, with future Rear Admiral George Stephen Morrison on board. At 07:53, Japanese planes flew over the base at low altitude  and within minutes some of Pruitts crew had sprinted to other ships and fired their first bullets. Others manned fire hoses and helped distribute ammunition during the attack on Pearl Harbor. At the end of January 1942, Pruitt completed overhaul and took up offshore patrol and minelaying duties with the Hawaiian Sea Frontier. Continuing operations there into June, she sailed, on the 19th, for Bremerton, Washington, from where she steamed to the Aleutian Islands for minelaying operations and escort assignments out of Kodiak. Into the fall she continued operations in the Aleutians, interrupted by regular runs back to the Hawaiian Islands, and then took up escort duties along the west coast.

With the new year, 1943, Pruitt shifted south and trained with the 4th Marine Raider Battalion off Southern California. Further escort assignments followed and on 24 April she departed San Francisco, California to return to the Aleutians. Sailing with TF 51, she steamed to Cold Bay, thence to Attu. On 11 May, she arrived off the latter, escorted landing craft into Massacre Bay, and then dispatched the boat waves. After the initial assault she took up anti-submarine and anti-aircraft patrols. Later shifting to Holtz Bay, she continued to perform patrol duties and to escort smaller craft from Amchitka and Adak until the end of the month.

On 6 June Pruitt returned to San Francisco and coastal escort duties. Through the summer she steamed along the coast from Alaska to Southern California and in September got underway for the Solomon Islands. At the end of October, she arrived at Purvis Bay, Florida Island, whence she steamed to Bougainville.

Taking on mines at Acre, New Hebrides, she planted mines along Bougainville's southern coast on the 2nd, 8th, and 24 November in support of operations on Cape Torokina, then in December shifted to escort assignments between and among the Solomons, New Hebrides, New Caledonia, and the Societies.

Pruitt returned to San Francisco on 18 July 1944, underwent overhaul, and in October sailed back to Pearl Harbor where she began submarine training operations. Detached toward the end of November, she patrolled off Midway from 29 November – 15 January 1945. On 22 January she resumed operations with the Training Command, Submarine Force and for the remainder of World War II trained submarines southwest of Oahu.

Redesignated AG–101 on 5 June 1945, she was ordered inactivated three months later, and on 21 September she sailed east, arriving at Philadelphia in October.

Fate
Decommissioning on 16 November 1945, she was struck from the Navy List on 5 December 1945. She was later scrapped at the Philadelphia Navy Yard.

Awards
Pruitt earned three battle stars during World War II.

Postscript
As of 5 October 2021, no other ship has been named USS Pruitt.

References

NavSource Online: Destroyer Photo Archive: USS Pruitt (DD-347/DM-22/AG-101)

Clemson-class destroyers
World War II mine warfare vessels of the United States
World War II auxiliary ships of the United States
Ships built in Bath, Maine
1920 ships
Ships present during the attack on Pearl Harbor
Ships of the Aleutian Islands campaign